Fabian Frei (born 8 January 1989) is a Swiss professional footballer who plays as a defensive midfielder and a centre-back for Swiss Super League club Basel and the Switzerland national team. Until June 2011, he played for the Swiss U-21 team. He made his international debut for Swiss senior team on 7 October 2011. He was selected to represent Switzerland at the 2012 Summer Olympics. He is of no relation to former club and country teammate Alexander Frei.

Club career

Basel
Born in Frauenfeld, Frei started his youth football with FC Frauenfeld and FC Winterthur, but he came through the ranks at FC Basel. With Basel he was Swiss Champion at both U-16 and U-18 levels. During the 2006–07 season, Frei played in the U-21 team, he played so well that he was given a professional contract. Because he was one of the best midfielders in the U-21 side, ahead of the 2007–08 season Frei was called into the first team squad.

Frei played his first team debut on 22 July 2007 in the 1–0 home win against FC Zürich. He played a major part in Basel's title and cup win in the 2007–08 season. He scored his first goal for the club on 4 December 2008 during Basel's 3–1 win over FC Aarau in the St. Jakob-Park Stadium. Frei played his first Europa League game, as substitute, on Thursday, 16 August 2007 in the Qualifier against SV Mattersburg. He played his UEFA Champions League debut for Basel on 26 November 2008 in the 5–0 away defeat against Shakhtar Donetsk.

In July 2009, due to the fact that Basel strengthened their squad for the beginning of the 2009–10 Swiss Super League season, Basel's new trainer Thorsten Fink loaned Fabian Frei to FC St. Gallen. During his two-year loan in St. Gallen he played 64 league games in which he scored 13 goals.

For the start of the 2011–12 Swiss Super League season he was recalled to Basel, the reigning Swiss Champions, and he immediately won his place in the starting eleven. Frei scored his first Champions League goal for Basel on 14 September 2011 in the Group C 2–1 home win against Oțelul Galați, his second on 27 September in the 3–3 draw at Old Trafford against Manchester United and his third on 22 November in the Arena Națională, in Bucharest, as Basel won the away game against Oțelul Galați 3–2. At the end of the 2011–12 season, Frei won the Double, the League Championship title and the Swiss Cup  with Basel.

At the end of the Swiss Super League season 2012–13 Frei won the Championship title and was Swiss Cup runner up with Basel. In the 2012–13 UEFA Europa League Basel advanced as far as the semi-finals, there being matched against the reigning UEFA Champions League holders Chelsea, but they were knocked out, losing both home and away tie, beaten 2–5 on aggregate.

At the end of the 2013–14 Super League season Frei won his fourth league championship with Basel. They also reached the final of the 2013–14 Swiss Cup, but were beaten 2–0 by Zürich after extra time. During the 2013–14 Champions League season Basel reached the group stage and finished the group in third position. Thus they qualified for Europa League knockout phase and here they advanced as far as the quarter-finals. In their season 2013–14 Basel played a total of 68 matches (36 Swiss League fixtures, 6 Swiss Cup, 6 Champions League and 10 Europa League and 10 test matches). Frei totaled 66 appearances, 34 League, 6 Cup, 6 Champions League and 10 Europa League as well all 10 in the test games.

The season 2014–15 was a very successful one for Basel and for Frei. The championship was won for the sixth time in a row  that season and in the 2014–15 Swiss Cup they reached the final. But for the third season in a row, they finished as runners-up, losing 0–3 to FC Sion in the final. Basel entered the Champions League in the group stage and reached the knockout phase as on 9 December 2014 they managed a 1–1 draw at Anfield against Liverpool. Frei scored the goal for FC Basel against Liverpool to help Basel to the next round of the UEFA Champions League. But then Basel then lost to FC Porto in the Round of 16. Basel played a total of 65 matches (36 Swiss League fixtures, 6 Swiss Cup, 8 Champions League and 15 test matches). Under trainer Paulo Sousa Frei totaled 56 appearances, 31 in the Super League, 5 Cup, 8 Champions League, as well 12 in test games. He scored a total of 4 goals in these matches.

Mainz 05
On 23 June 2015, Frei joined German Bundesliga club 1. FSV Mainz 05.

Return to Basel
On 23 December 2017, FC Basel announced that Frei would return to the club, signing a four and a half year contract dated up until June 2022.

Under trainer Marcel Koller Basel won the Swiss Cup in the 2018–19 season. In the first round Basel beat Montlingen 3–0, in the second round Echallens Région 7–2 and in the round of 16 Winterthur 1–0. In the quarter finals Sion were defeated 4–2 after extra time and in the semi finals Zürich were defeated 3–1. All these games were played away from home. The final was held on 19 May 2019 in the Stade de Suisse Wankdorf Bern against Thun. Striker Albian Ajeti scored the first goal, Fabian Frei the second for Basel, then Dejan Sorgić netted a goal for Thun, but the end result was 2–1 for Basel. Frei played in five cup games and scored not only in the final but also a goal in the match against Echallens.

International career
Frei represented Switzerland at various age levels. He played his Swiss Under-16s debut on 12 October 2004 in the 3–1 away win against the Belgium Under-16s. In 14 games for the Switzerland U-17 team he scored ten goals.

Between 2008 and 2011 Fabian Frei played 18 games for the Switzerland U-21 team. His Under-21s debut was on 19 November 2008 in the 1–1 away draw against the Greece Under-21 team. His last game was the 2011 UEFA European Under-21 Championship Final on 25 June 2011.

Following this he was called into the Swiss national football team by trainer Ottmar Hitzfeld. Frei gave his international debut for Switzerland on 7 October 2011 in the UEFA Euro 2012 qualifying game in the Liberty Stadium against Wales.

Frei was selected to represent Switzerland in the men's football tournament at the 2012 Summer Olympics as part of the Swiss under-23 team. He played over 90 minutes in all three games in the tournament, but the team were knocked out, finishing in fourth position of their Group.

Career statistics

Club

International goals
Scores and results list Switzerland's goal tally first, score column indicates score after each Frei goal.

Honours

Club
Basel
 Swiss Super League (5): 2007–08, 2011–12, 2012–13, 2013–14, 2014–15
 Swiss Cup (3): 2007–08, 2011–12, 2018–19 
 Swiss Cup runner up (3): 2012–13, 2013–14, 2014–15
 Uhren Cup  (3): 2008, 2011, 2013
 U18 Swiss Champion  (1): 2005–06
 U19 Swiss Cup (1): 2005–06

International
 UEFA Euro U21 Runner-up: 2011

Individual
Basel
 Goal of the Year 2008–09: scored on 5 December 2008 against FC Aarau
 UEFA Europa League Squad of the Season: 2019–20

References

External links
 Profile at FC Basel 
 Profile at Swiss Football League Website 

Swiss men's footballers
1989 births
Living people
FC Basel players
FC Winterthur players
FC St. Gallen players
1. FSV Mainz 05 players
Bundesliga players
Swiss expatriate footballers
Expatriate footballers in Germany
Swiss Super League players
Swiss-German people
People from Frauenfeld
Switzerland international footballers
Switzerland under-21 international footballers
Switzerland youth international footballers
Footballers at the 2012 Summer Olympics
Olympic footballers of Switzerland
FC Frauenfeld players
UEFA Euro 2016 players
2022 FIFA World Cup players
Association football central defenders
Association football midfielders
Sportspeople from Thurgau